Massachusetts House of Representatives' 12th Bristol district in the United States is one of 160 legislative districts included in the lower house of the Massachusetts General Court. It covers parts of Bristol County and Plymouth County. Republican Norman Orrall of Lakeville has represented the district since 2019.

Towns represented
The district includes the following localities:
 Berkley
 Lakeville
 Middleborough
 part of Taunton

The current district geographic boundary overlaps with those of the Massachusetts Senate's 1st Bristol and Plymouth and 1st Plymouth and Bristol districts.

Former locales
The district previously covered:
 Acushnet, circa 1872 
 Fairhaven, circa 1872 
 part of Fall River, circa 1927 
 Westport, circa 1927

Representatives
 Thomas G. Nichols, circa 1858 
 William S. Crane, circa 1859 
 Martin L. Eldridge, circa 1858-1859 
 Thomas Edward Kitchen, circa 1951 
 Matthew J. Kuss, circa 1975 
 Stephen Canessa, circa 2011
 Keiko Orrall, September 22, 2011 – January 5, 2019 
 Norman J. Orrall, 2019-current

See also
 List of Massachusetts House of Representatives elections
 Other Bristol County districts of the Massachusetts House of Representatives: 1st, 2nd, 3rd, 4th, 5th, 6th, 7th, 8th, 9th, 10th, 11th, 13th, 14th
 List of Massachusetts General Courts
 List of former districts of the Massachusetts House of Representatives

Images

References

External links
 Ballotpedia
  (State House district information based on U.S. Census Bureau's American Community Survey).

House
Government of Bristol County, Massachusetts
Government of Plymouth County, Massachusetts